Heterodyne refers to a radio signal processing technique.

Heterodyne may also refer to:
 Characters in the anime television series Dai-Guard
 Characters in the webcomic Girl Genius
 Heterodyne (poetry)
 Heterodyne., Hellnear's doujin music circle
 Heterodyne detection
 Optical heterodyne detection